Maximilian Gustav Albrecht Richard Augustin Graf von Götzen-Iturbide (born 2 March 1944) is a Hungarian-born businessman and head of the Imperial House of Mexico since 1949.

Life and career

Götzen was born in Beszterce, Kingdom of Hungary (now Bistrița, Romania), the son of Baroness Maria Gizela Tunkl von Aschbrunn und Hohenstadt and her second husband Count Gustav von Götzen. His maternal grandmother, María Josepha Sophia de Iturbide, was the eldest child of Prince Salvador de Iturbide, a grandson of Agustín de Iturbide, Emperor of Mexico, and an adopted son of Emperor Maximilian I. By permission of the Hungarian Interior Ministry, the children of Baroness Maria Gizela and Count Gustav were allowed to use the surname Götzen-Iturbide, while Götzen's given names reflect his lineage from Mexico's two emperors. Maximilian has a younger sister, Emanuela von Götzen-Iturbide (born 1945).

In the years following the Second World War, the family settled in South America, and Götzen's father died in 1956 in Caracas. Three years later, in Montevideo, his mother married thirdly Ottavio della Porta. The family eventually moved to Australia.

Götzen was educated at Hawtreys in England. He has worked as a stockbroker and has real estate business interests in Morelia and Guadalajara.

Mexican Imperial House

Götzen does not pursue any claim to the throne and has said his only political interest is the legacy and reputation of his ancestor Augustin de Iturbide, the leader of Mexico's independence movement.

Despite Götzen not actively pursuing any claim himself, social media users claiming to be Mexican monarchists have posted their support of his claim.

Family

Götzen was married in Melbourne on 22 September 1990 to Anna Rosa Maria Helena von Franceschi, daughter of Johann Karl von Franceschi and Maria Martha Kukuljevic-Bassani de Sacchi. They have two children:
 Count Ferdinand von Götzen-Iturbide (born 1992 in Perth),
 Countess Isabella von Götzen-Iturbide (born 1997 in London)

Genealogy

Relation to the Mexican emperors

References

1944 births
Counts of Germany
German nobility
Pretenders to the Mexican throne
Mexican monarchy
Living people
People educated at Hawtreys
People from Bistrița
Mexican expatriates in Australia
Mexican people of German descent
Mexican people of Hungarian descent